Agafu Gumas is a settlement in the north of Guam. It is located close to Andersen Air Force Base, to the north of Yigo.

Populated places in Guam
Yigo, Guam